Lick's Homeburgers & Ice Cream was a Canadian restaurant chain. Only one restaurant continues to use the name Licks (in Parry Sound). The company continues to sell frozen food. It is owned by Lick's Concepts, Inc., a private company. The first Lick's opened in 1980, operated by Denise Meehan, who then turned the concept into a franchise in 1984. At its height in 2012, the chain had 30 locations, all in Ontario.

Lick's was formerly known for its hamburgers, nicknamed "homeburgers", which were considered higher quality than those of other fast food chains. The chain also had what was described as a "zany in-store experience", with employees singing pop songs, sometimes with modified lyrics, while they cooked burgers and fries. Both concepts were abandoned in the 2000s, as the company switched to a more generic brand identity as well as the use of frozen instead of fresh hamburger patties.

History 
Denise Meehan, a native of Sturgeon Falls, Ontario, grew up in a tourist resort operated by her parents. Meehan, the president and sole shareholder, founded the chain in 1980 with a $5,000 loan. Meehan opened her first Lick's location store on Queen Street East in Toronto in 1980. The second store opened at 2383 Kingston Rd in Scarborough several years later. (Both these locations are now defunct.)  From 1984 through 2009, the business expanded to several cities in the province of Ontario as the Lick's name and menu became available for franchise.  At its zenith in 2012, there were over 30 Lick's locations throughout southern Ontario. In addition, major Ontario supermarket chains also carried frozen Lick's hamburger patties.

In 2002, Meehan was named to the Sales Hall of Fame by the Canadian Professional Sales Association. Meehan was profiled by Hilary magazine in 2008.

Lick's began to encounter difficulty in the aftermath of the 2008 financial crisis, partly because of the recession's effect on consumer habits shifting away from sit-down eateries to takeout.  As well, the proliferation of gourmet burger chains such as The Burger's Priest and The Works eroded Lick's market share.

There was a wave of closings of Toronto-area Lick's franchises in 2012 and 2013, including the closing of the original location. By April 2017, the chain had two stores left: one in Toronto and one in Parry Sound.

In July 2021, the last remaining restaurant in Toronto, at 900 Warden Avenue, ceased being a franchisee and was renamed Andy's Artisan Burgers, leaving one remaining Lick's restaurant in Parry Sound, Ontario. The online frozen burger business continues.

References

External links
Official website

Fast-food chains of Canada
Restaurants in Toronto
Fast-food hamburger restaurants